Donald Schmitt (born 1951) is a Canadian architect.

Born in 1951 in South Porcupine, a mining town in northern Ontario, he went to high school at the University of Toronto Schools (UTS) and studied afterwards at the University of Toronto Faculty of Architecture.

Donald Schmitt has practiced architecture with A.J Diamond since 1978 and is a Principal in the firm currently known as Diamond Schmitt Architects Incorporated.

He is the Founding Chair of the Public Art Commission for the City of Toronto for which he was awarded the Civic Medal and is currently a member of the University of Toronto Design Review Panel.  He served on the Design Review Panel of the National Capital Commission for over a decade and for many years for Waterfront Toronto.

Buildings of Note

1983: Metro Toronto YMCA, Toronto, Ontario, Canada
2002: Bahen Centre for Information Technology, University of Toronto, Toronto, Ontario, Canada
2002:  University of Ontario Institute of Technology Master Plan
2003: Max M. Fisher Music Center, Detroit, Michigan, USA
2004: Pierre Berton Resource Library, Vaughan, Ontario, Canada
2005: University of Guelph-Humber Academic Building, Toronto, Ontario, Canada
2008: Cambridge City Hall, Cambridge, Ontario
2010: Evergreen Brick Works Centre for Sustainability, Toronto, Ontario, Canada
2013: Hospital for Sick Children Research Building, Toronto, Ontario, Canada

Work in Progress

Barrie Waterfront Development Project, Barrie, Ontario, Canada
 St. Catharines Centre for the Performing Arts, St. Catharines, Ontario, Canada
 Brock University School of Performing Arts, St. Catharines, Ontario, Canada
 Emily Carr University of Art+Design, Vancouver, British Columbia, Canada

Publications
1996:  Works: The Architecture of A.J. Diamond, Donald Schmitt and Company, 1968-1995

2008: Insight and On Site, The Architecture of Diamond and Schmitt.

Awards
 2019 Order of Canada

References

External links
Diamond and Schmitt Architects Incorporated

Canadian architects
Living people
1951 births
Members of the Royal Architectural Institute of Canada